Fred Jones is a former professional American football player who played wide receiver for four seasons with the Kansas City Chiefs under Coach Marty Schottenheimer.

College

Jones played his collegiate career under the leadership of National Collegiate Athletic Association coach Eddie Robinson at Grambling State University in Grambling, Louisiana. While under the tutelage and stewardship of Coach Robinson, Jones excelled as a student at Grambling and as an athlete within Grambling's athletic program in the Southwestern Athletic Conference (SWAC). He graduated with a degree in Education from Grambling State University's NCATE Accredited College of Education. Grambling State University won the Bayou Classic twice while Jones was playing for the university. 

Jones is also a graduate of Southwest Dekalb High School in Decatur, Georgia. While attending Southwest Dekalb he played under the stewardship of Georgia Athletic Coaches Association Hall of Famer William 'Buck' Godfrey. Jones was an offensive player and performed well under Godfrey's offensive scheme. During his senior season Jones was one of Dekalb County top offensive players and he rushed for more than 1,000 yards that season.

Personal life

Jones is a member of Omega Psi Phi fraternity. He is involved in Georgia high school football as a coach.

References

1967 births
American football wide receivers
Kansas City Chiefs players
Grambling State Tigers football players
Living people